Baruj (also Romanized as Bārūj and Barooj; also known as Bare, Bareh, Bārī, Bary, Bereh, and Pareh) is a village in Zolbin Rural District, Yamchi District, Marand County, East Azerbaijan Province, Iran. At the 2006 census, its population was 2,340, in 574 families.

References 

Populated places in Marand County